London Buses route 89 is a Transport for London contracted bus route in London, England. Running between Slade Green station and Lewisham bus station, it is operated by London Central.

The route has a night service, N89.

History
In 2010, the frequency of the night service was increased from every half hour to every 20 minutes.

Upon being re-tendered in 2011, route 89 was retained by London Central.

Passenger numbers on route 89 fell from 3.94 million in 2012-13 to 3.62 million in 2016-17. In November 2017 the frequency of the service was cut from every 10 minutes to every 12 minutes and the night service N89 was cut from every 20 minutes to every half hour.

Current route
Route 89 operates via these primary locations:
Slade Green station 
Bexleyheath ASDA
Welling High Street
Shooters Hill Road
Charlton Park Lane
Blackheath station 
Lewisham High Street
Lewisham station

References

External links

Timetable

Bus routes in London
Transport in the London Borough of Bexley
Transport in the Royal Borough of Greenwich
Transport in the London Borough of Lewisham